Gull Lake Airport  is located  south of Gull Lake, Saskatchewan, Canada.

See also 
List of airports in Saskatchewan

References 

Registered aerodromes in Saskatchewan
Gull Lake No. 139, Saskatchewan